Gregan McMahon, CBE (2 March 1874 – 30 August 1941) was an Australian actor and theatrical director and producer.

Early life 
McMahon was born in Sydney, elder son of John Terence McMahon, a clerk, and his wife Elizabeth, née Gregan. Both parents were emigrants from Ireland. McMahon was educated at Sydney Grammar School and Saint Ignatius' College, Riverview. McMahon played in the Riverview football team, and took first-class honours in classics at his matriculation examination. McMahon graduated with a BA at the University of Sydney in 1896 and during his course, established a reputation as an amateur actor – a critic on one occasion spoke of his performance being so artistic that he seemed like a professional in a company of amateurs.

Career 
After university, McMahon was articled to a firm of solicitors at Sydney, and remained there for some years. On 4 October 1899 McMahon married Mary Kate, daughter of Thomas Hungerford. In May 1900 he was invited by Robert Brough to join his comedy company. His first professional appearance was as the waiter in The Liars at Brisbane in the beginning of June, and during the next 12 months he toured India and China playing a variety of small parts. Returning to Australia McMahon played with the William Hawtrey and Brough companies, and, by 1902 he was more important roles, including that of "Horace Parker", in A Message from Mars.

McMahon's establishment of the Melbourne Repertory Theatre Company (of which he was artistic director from 1911–1918 and 1926–1928) as an artistically and financially successful company is seen by some as the first Australian theatre company. Seasons followed in New Zealand and Australia, largely in companies under the J. C. Williamson's management. Early in 1911 McMahon, who had been playing in Melbourne, organised a repertory theatre movement. The first performances took place in June, the plays selected being St John Hankin's The Two Mr Wetherbys, the second act of Sheridan's The Critic, and Ibsen's John Gabriel Borkman.

Among the plays McMahon produced from 1911–1917 were Candida, Getting Married, Major Barbara, The Doctor's Dilemma, Man and Superman, Fanny's First Play, You Never Can Tell, and Pygmalion, all by George Bernard Shaw; Rosmersholm and An Enemy of the People by Henrik Ibsen; The Voysey Inheritance and The Madras House by Granville Barker; The Pigeon, Strife and The Fugitive by Galsworthy; The Seagull by Anton Chekhov; The Mate by Arthur Schnitzler, and many other plays by leading dramatists of the period, including several by Australian authors. McMahon is also seen as having brought the techniques and approaches of the Russian and Soviet theatre practitioners like Stanislavski and Meyerhold to Australian theatre.

World War I had a significant effect on theatre and several leading actors enlisted. After the war McMahon returned to the professional stage and acted as producer for Williamson and other managers. In 1920 he arranged with the Messrs Tait to start a repertory movement in Sydney. This was carried on for several years, the productions including The Dover Road by Milne; Abraham Lincoln by John Drinkwater; Ibsen's John Gabriel Borkman; Franz Molnar's Liliom; Galsworthy's Foundations, Loyalties, and Windows; and many others.

With the break-up of the Sydney Repertory Theatre, the Sydney Players' Club was formed from its members, notably W. F. Jackson and S. R. Irving. Another notable alumnus was Doris Fitton, who went on to found the Independent Theatre.

In Melbourne in 1929 McMahon revived the repertory movement under the "Gregan McMahon Players" and in 11 years placed about 90 plays on the stage, including several of the later Shaw plays; Pirandello's Right You Are and Six Characters in Search of an Author; several plays by James Bridie; and others by Galsworthy, Drinkwater, W. Somerset Maugham, G. K. Chesterton, Eugene O'Neill, Seán O'Casey, Daviot and Casella, in the presentation of which a generally high standard was reached. In spite of difficulties caused by war breaking out again, McMahon was still keeping up his standard of production when he died suddenly on 30 August 1941.

Personal life and honours 
McMahon was survived by his wife, Mary Hungerford McMahon, whom he had married in 1899, and a son (also named Gregan McMahon) and a daughter. He was created CBE in 1938.

References

1874 births
1941 deaths
Australian male stage actors
Commanders of the Order of the British Empire
Australian people of Irish descent
Male actors from Sydney
University of Sydney alumni
People educated at Sydney Grammar School
People educated at Saint Ignatius' College, Riverview